Paper Gods is the fourteenth studio album by English new wave band Duran Duran, released on 11 September 2015 by Warner Bros. Records. The album was produced by Mr Hudson and Joshua Blair, who had worked with the band on All You Need Is Now (2010) and A Diamond in the Mind: Live 2011 (2012); Nile Rodgers, who had previously first worked on the band's "The Reflex", his remixed version reaching number one, "The Wild Boys" single and Notorious album, and Mark Ronson, who produced All You Need Is Now. The first single, "Pressure Off", features vocals from American singer Janelle Monáe. The album was supported by the Paper Gods on Tour.

Release
The album cover, designed by artist Alex Israel, consists of his 2013 painting titled "Sky Backdrop", that features icons that represent the band's history. This includes lips and the eye painted by artist Patrick Nagel for their Rio album; also representing the Rio album is a chauffeur's cap alluding to that record's closing track "The Chauffeur"; a pink telephone, champagne glass and the saxophone representing the single "Rio"; a sumo wrestler representing their controversial video for "Girls on Film"; Duran Duran's teeth are shown to be from "The Wild Boys"; the Eiffel Tower is a reference to the title song from the film A View to a Kill; a rocket from the greatest hits album, Decade; a silhouette of a female representing the single "Skin Trade"; an image of a tiger and a snake nodding to their third album Seven and the Ragged Tiger; a white shoe from the single cover and the music video of "Come Undone"; a stylized ice cream cone taken from their "Perfect Day" single. The deluxe physical copy of the record comes with sixteen stickers of Duran Duran iconography to mirror the album cover.

Promotion
The band announced a tour of the United States and the United Kingdom to coincide with the album's release.

The lead single from the album, "Pressure Off", was released in the United States on 19 June, first via Microsoft's Xbox Music. The song subsequently appeared on Google Music.

Commercial performance
The album entered the UK Albums Chart at number five, becoming the band's ninth top-five album overall and making them one of only a handful of bands who have scored top-five albums in four consecutive decades. In the United States, it entered the Billboard 200 at number 10 and became their first top-10 album since Duran Duran (1993). In its second week, the album fell to number 76, and in its third and final week fell to number 194, though it re-entered the Billboard 200 at number 45 in January 2016. In Italy, the album peaked at number two.

Track listing

Notes
  signifies lead vocal production
  signifies an additional producer

Personnel
Credits adapted from the liner notes of the deluxe edition of Paper Gods.

Duran Duran
 Simon Le Bon
 Nick Rhodes
 John Taylor
 Roger Taylor

Additional musicians
 Mr Hudson – vocals 
 David Emery – additional drum programming 
 Kiesza – vocals 
 Janelle Monáe – vocals 
 Nile Rodgers – featured performer 
 Davide Rossi – string arrangement and performance 
 Josh Blair – string arrangement 
 Lindsay Lohan – special guest vocals 
 John Frusciante – guitars 
 Hollie Cook – additional vocals 
 Jonas Bjerre – featured performer 
 Dom Brown – guitars 
 Anna Ross – additional vocals 
 Voce Chamber Choir – additional voices 
 London Youth Chamber Choir – additional voices 
 Suzi Digby – conducting, artistic direction 
 Toby Young – choir arrangement 
 Steve Jones – guitars

Technical
 Duran Duran – production 
 Mr Hudson – production ; additional production 
 Josh Blair – production ; lead vocal production ; additional production ; mixing ; engineering 
 Mark Ronson – production 
 Nile Rodgers – production ; additional production 
 Riccardo Damian – Pro Tools operator 
 Graham Russell – Janelle session engineering 
 Ghian Wright – Janelle session engineering 
 Jake Valentine – Janelle session engineering assistance 
 Mark "Spike" Stent – mixing at Mixsuite and Battersea Park Studios (London)
 Geoff Swan – mix engineering assistance
 Ted Jensen – mastering at Sterling Sound (New York City)
 Wendy Laister – executive production

Artwork
 Alex Israel – artwork, art direction
 China Chow – creative direction, art direction
 Brian Roettinger – art direction, logo
 Nick Rhodes – photography

Charts

Weekly charts

Year-end charts

Notes

References

External links
 

2015 albums
Albums produced by Mark Ronson
Albums produced by Mr Hudson
Albums produced by Nile Rodgers
Duran Duran albums
Warner Records albums